The NYSE Arca Oil Index, previously AMEX Oil Index, ticker symbol XOI, is a price-weighted index of the leading companies involved in the exploration, production, and development of petroleum. It measures the performance of the oil industry through changes in the sum of the prices of component stocks. The index was developed with a base level of 125 as of August 27, 1984.

Components
The components of the index are as follows:

References

External links
 Bloomberg page for Amex Oil Index
Yahoo Finance page for NYSEARCAOIL&GASINDEX
 Reuters page for .XOI
 

American stock market indices
Stock market indices by industry
Petroleum industry in the United States